The list of ship launches in 1869 includes a chronological list of some ships launched in 1869.


References 

Sources

1869
Ship launches